Raymond Bowers was an Australian writer who mostly worked in London. He worked as a journalist in Perth, writing for amateur theatre. In 1954 at age 34 he went to London in order to improve his chances of having his work done professionally. His breakthrough play was In Writing in 1956, later done for Australian television. "My first aim is to make money," he said in 1957. "To do that you have to entertain. If I have any philosophising to do, I'll leave it until I'm well established."

Select credits
In Writing (1956) - BBC TV play
Opportunity Murder (1956) - TV series
It's the Geography That Counts (1957) - play
More Than Robbery (1958) - TV series
Here Lies Miss Sabry (1960) - British TV series
It's the Geography That Counts (1960) - Australian TV play, based on his play
Deadline Midnight (1960) - British TV series
In Writing (1961) - Australian TV Play
Listen James (1961) - British TV play based on his play It's the Geography that Counts
It Happened Like This (1962) - British TV series
The Clostin Case (1962) play
The Right Thing (1963) - Australian TV play
The Plane Makers (1965–66) - TV series
The Rat Catchers (1966) - British TV series
The Power Game (1967–68) - British TV series
Crossroads - TV series

References

External links
Raymond Bowers at IMDb

Australian screenwriters